Abelardo Aguilú Jr. (c. 1870 – c. 1940) was Mayor of Ponce, Puerto Rico, from 1924 to 1925. Prior to that he was a shopkeeper in Ponce, selling groceries, liquor, and tobacco.

See also

 Ponce, Puerto Rico
 List of Puerto Ricans

References

Further reading
 Fay Fowlie de Flores. Ponce, Perla del Sur: Una Bibliografía Anotada. Second Edition. 1997. Ponce, Puerto Rico: Universidad de Puerto Rico en Ponce. p. 216. Item 1109. 
 Cayetano Coll y Toste. Boletín Histórico de Puerto Rico. San Juan, Puerto Rico: Cantera Fernandez. 1914–1927. (Colegio Universitario Tecnológico de Ponce, CUTPO).
 Fay Fowlie de Flores. Ponce, Perla del Sur: Una Bibliografía Anotada. Second Edition. 1997. Ponce, Puerto Rico: Universidad de Puerto Rico en Ponce. p. 338. Item 1684. 
 Jose Joaquin Rodriguez. "Partido Socialista y el Ligao de Ponce." Punto y Coma. Año 2 (1990) pp. 21–24. (Colegio Universitario Tecnológico de Ponce, CUTPO)

Mayors of Ponce, Puerto Rico
1870s births
1940s deaths
Year of birth uncertain
Year of death uncertain